WNDZ (750 AM) is a radio station broadcasting a brokered programming format. Licensed to Portage, Indiana, United States, it serves the Chicago area. The station is owned by Newsweb Corporation. WNDZ operates as a daytime-only station.

History
WNDZ began broadcasting on May 13, 1987 as a daytime-only station, running 2,500 watts, and was owned by Universal Broadcasting, with Rick Schwartz as its first General Manager. The business office and studios were located in Lansing, Illinois. They are currently on Milwaukee Avenue in Chicago. The station originally aired a mixture of religious and ethnic programming. In 1992, the station was sold to Douglas Broadcasting, for $2 million. In 1994, the station joined Douglas Broadcasting's new AsiaOne network. In 1997, the station's power was increased to 5,000 watts. In late May 1998, the station switched from brokered programming to the motivational "Personal Achievement Radio" network, which moved from WYPA 820. Later that year, the station was purchased by Z-Spanish Radio. In 2000, Z-Spanish Radio was acquired by Entravision Communications.

In 2004, Entravision Communications sold the station to Newsweb Corporation, along with 99.9 FM WRZA, for $24 million. In 2007, the station's power was increased to 15,000 watts. The format has remained brokered for most of the station's history, even during the time it was owned by Entravision.

Shows
Programming includes various brokered foreign language programming, much of it in Slavic languages including: Serbian, Croatian, Macedonian, etc. Other programs are geared towards other Eastern European languages including Romanian. Spanish language programming also airs in addition to English language Religious programming, at times geared towards English-speaking Europeans.

Automated Adult Contemporary music (in English) fills the rest of the airtime.

References

External links

Portage, Indiana
Radio stations established in 1987
NDZ
Brokered programming
1987 establishments in Indiana